This is a chronological list of the five pay-per-views promoted by World Wrestling All-Stars (WWA) between 2001 and 2003.

Event dates and venues

History

The Inception

The Inception was the first pay-per-view event by WWA, which took place at the Sydney Super Dome in Sydney, Australia on October 26, 2001. The event was broadcast live on pay-per-view in Australia and via tape delay in the United States on January 6, 2002.

The event featured a Seven Deadly Sins tournament to crown a new World Heavyweight Champion after previous champion Road Dogg was stripped of the title, so a new champion could be crowned. Jeff Jarrett defeated Road Dogg in a Steel Cage match in the tournament final to win the vacant title. The event also featured a ladder match in the first round of the Seven Deadly Sins, in which Juventud Guerrera defeated Psicosis to win the vacant International Cruiserweight Championship.

The Revolution

The Revolution was the second pay-per-view event by WWA, which took place on February 24, 2002 from the Aladdin Casino Center in Las Vegas, Nevada, United States.

Jeff Jarrett defended the World Heavyweight Championship against Brian Christopher in the main event. Jarrett was originally scheduled to defend the title against Randy Savage, but Savage no-showed the event and was replaced by Christopher. Jarrett retained the title. Also at the event, Eddie Guerrero defeated defending champion Psicosis and Juventud Guerrera in a triple threat match to capture the International Cruiserweight Championship.

The Eruption

The Eruption was the third pay-per-view event by WWA. The event took place on April 13, 2002 at the Rod Laver Arena in Melbourne, Australia. The event aired in the United States via tape delay on April 14, 2002.

Nathan Jones defended the World Heavyweight Championship against Scott Steiner in the main event, with Sid Vicious serving as the special outside enforcer. Steiner defeated Jones to win the title. In other prominent matches on the event, Sabu defeated Crowbar in a steel cage match and A.J. Styles defeated Jerry Lynn in the finals of a tournament to win the vacant International Cruiserweight Championship.

The Retribution

The Retribution was the fourth pay-per-view event by WWA. The event took place on December 6, 2002 at the Scottish Exhibition and Conference Centre in Glasgow, Scotland. The event aired in the United States on February 9, 2003 via tape delay.

Lex Luger defeated Sting in the main event to win the vacant WWA World Heavyweight Championship. Predominant matches on the undercard were a three-way match between Sabu, Simon Diamond and Perry Saturn and a title defense of the NWA World Heavyweight Championship by Jeff Jarrett against Nathan Jones.

The Reckoning

The Reckoning was the fifth and final pay-per-view by WWA. The event took place on May 25, 2003 at the North Shore Events Centre in Auckland, New Zealand. The event aired via tape delay in the United States on June 8, 2003.

The main event was a title unification match between the WWA World Heavyweight Champion Sting and the NWA World Heavyweight Champion Jeff Jarrett, in which Jarrett defeated Sting to unify the WWA title into the NWA title. The WWA International Cruiserweight Championship was also unified into the TNA X Division Championship in a four-way match, with the X Division Champion Chris Sabin defeating International Cruiserweight Champion Jerry Lynn, Frankie Kazarian and Johnny Swinger to unify the titles.

See also
List of All Elite Wrestling pay-per-view events
List of ECW supercards and pay-per-view events
List of FMW supercards and pay-per-view events
List of Global Force Wrestling events and specials
List of Impact Wrestling pay-per-view events
List of Major League Wrestling events
List of National Wrestling Alliance pay-per-view events
List of NWA/WCW closed-circuit events and pay-per-view events
List of NJPW pay-per-view events
List of Smokey Mountain Wrestling supercard events
List of WCW Clash of the Champions shows
List of World Class Championship Wrestling Supercard events
List of WWE pay-per-view and WWE Network events
List of WWE Saturday Night Main Event shows
List of WWE Tribute to the Troops shows

References

External links
WWA The Inception results
WWA The Revolution results
WWA The Eruption results
WWA Retribution results
WWA The Reckoning results

Pay-Per-View Events
Professional wrestling shows
2001 in professional wrestling
2002 in professional wrestling
2003 in professional wrestling
Professional wrestling in Australia
Professional wrestling-related lists
World Wrestling All-Stars events
World Wrestling All-Stars